Folkodia is an international music project formed in 2007 as an offshoot of Folkearth by musicians playing folk and Viking metal.

History 
Folkodia was founded in the end of 2007.

Musicians from several countries (Greece, Russia, Switzerland, Lithuania, Australia, Monaco, Canada, USA, Germany, Italy, France, etc.) and other bands (Folkearth, Sunuthar, Minhyriath, Black Knight Symphonia, Troldhaugen, Seventh Sword and some others) had been involved in the project throughout the years.

The genre played by the band is epic folk/Viking metal enriched by the use of different acoustic instruments including flute, pipes, and violin.

The first album of the project, Odes from the past, was released in June 2008 by the band itself. 
Later on the band signed a contract with Stygian Crypt Productions for the release of the second album, In A Time Of Legends, that was out on the 14th of April 2009.

The third album titled Battlecry was released again by Stygian Crypt Productions on the 4th of March 2010.

The collaboration with Stygian Crypt Productions went on and led to the release of a fourth album titled Forgotten Lore, that was out in 2011, a fifth album titled Battles And Myths, that was out in 2012, and a sixth album titled The Fall Of The Magog, that was out in 2013.

Battles And Myths was elected folk metal album of the year in the Netherlands.

The release of The Fall Of The Magog coincided with the loss of the founder and leader of the band Ruslanas Danisevskis (Metfolvik), who died after a long fight against cancer.

Band members

Discography 
 Odes from the Past (2008)
 In a Time of Legends (2009)
 Battlecry (2010)
 Forgotten Lore (2011 - acoustic album)
 Battles and Myths (2012)
 The Fall of the Magog (2013)
 Battle of the Milvian Bridge (2017)

See also
 Folkearth

References

External links 
 Folkodia homepage
 Folkodia Youtube channel

Folk metal musical groups
Viking metal musical groups